{{Infobox KHL team
| team   = ERA Renomar HYC Herentals
| colour     = background:#FFFFFF; border-top:#E4012F 5px solid; border-bottom:#E4012F 5px solid;
| colour text= #000000
| logo      = HYC_Herentals_logo.png
| logosize  = 195px
| name2   = 
| nickname   = 
| founded    = 1971
| folded  = 
| city   = Herentals, Belgium
| arena      = Sport Vlaanderen Netepark
| capacity   = 1600
| league     = BeNe League2015-presentEredivisie
2012-2015North Sea Cup2010-2012Belgian Hockey League1971-2012BelgianCup| division   = 
| conference = 
| uniform    = 
| colours    = Red, white 
| owner      = 
| gm         = 
| coach = Sami Lipsonen
| ass_coach  = Vincent Morgan
| ass_coach2 =  Nils Vroemans
| captain    = Mitch Morgan
| president  =
| affiliates = 
| website    = HYC Herentals
| current    = 

| name1       =  HYC Herentals
| dates1      = 1971 - Present
}}HYC Herentals is an ice hockey team in Herentals, Belgium. They play in the BeNe League and are known, for sponsorship reasons, as ERA Renomar HYC Herentals.

History
The club was founded in 1971. They won their first of nine Belgian Hockey League titles in 1981. In 1986, Herentals won the inaugural Belgian Cup. They have won the cup eight more times since. In 2010, it switched from the Belgian Hockey League to the North Sea Cup, a combined Belgian-Dutch elite league.  When the North Sea Cup disbanded only two years later in 2012, it joined the Eredivisie.

North Sea Cup/Eredivisie ResultsNote: GP = Games played, W = Wins, OTW = Overtime Wins, OTL = Overtime Losses, L = Losses, GF = Goals for, GA = Goals against, Pts = PointsRoster 
Updated February 26, 2019.

 HYC Herentals 2 

As with many ice hockey clubs in the Benelux countries, HYC Herentals operates teams at several levels.  The HYC Herentals second team plays in the Belgian Hockey League.  

Belgian Hockey League ResultsNote:''' GP = Games played, W = Wins, OTW = Overtime Wins, OTL = Overtime Losses, L = Losses, GF = Goals for, GA = Goals against, Pts = Points

Achievements

 Belgian champion: (15) 1981, 1984, 1985, 1993, 1994, 1997, 1998, 2002, 2009, 2012, 2016, 2017, 2018, 2019, 2020.
 Belgian Division II champion: (1) 2005.
 Belgian Cup (13): 1986, 1989, 1991, 1995, 1999, 2000, 2003, 2012, 2013, 2016, 2017, 2019, 2020.
 BeNe League (2): 2016, 2019.

References

External links
 Official Website 
 Team profile on hockeyarenas.net

BeNe League (ice hockey) teams
Ice hockey teams in Belgium
1971 establishments in Belgium
Herentals